Scott Reynolds is an American punk rock vocalist from Fredonia, New York, known mainly for his work with the band ALL from 1989 to 1993. He has also performed with such bands as The Pavers and Goodbye Harry.

Time with ALL 
Reynolds was pop-punk band ALL's second lead singer, replacing Dave Smalley in 1989. He recorded and toured with the group extensively from 1989 - 1993. His songwriting contributions with All were notable; his Dot off 1993's Percolater was the group's first single not written by drummer Bill Stevenson. Reynolds left ALL in 1993 reportedly due to differences in the band regarding touring schedules.

All formed in suburban Los Angeles in 1987 when Milo Aukerman, the lead singer of The Descendents, left to pursue a graduate degree in biochemistry, forcing the band into a hiatus. The remaining members, guitarist Stephen Egerton, bassist Karl Alvarez, and drummer Bill Stevenson decided to carry on as a band, adopting the title of the Descendents’ last studio album, All, as their official moniker.

Enlisting former Dag Nasty and DYS singer Dave Smalley on vocals, All released their first two albums in 1988: Allroy Sez and the EP Allroy for Prez (both distributed by Cruz Records) to critical acclaim. In 1989, Smalley left the band, and new vocalist Scott Reynolds joined. With Reynolds, All released four more albums: 1989 Allroy's Revenge (which included the single She's My Ex), 1990 Allroy Saves, 1992 Percolater, and the 1990 live album Trailblazer.

Post ALL 
After ALL, he started the short-lived band Three Car Pile-Up followed by Goodbye Harry. Goodbye Harry put out two albums. In the mid-1990s Reynolds moved from Missouri (then ALL headquarters), to Buffalo, NY. During this time he is purported to have held a variety of jobs with music as a hobby. At some point in the late 1990s he formed the pop-punk band The Pavers. The Pavers released two albums, two EPs, a live radio cd, and a variety of split EPs. In the early 2000s, frustrated with major label non-response to music that was lauded by fans and critics, he moved from Buffalo, NY to Austin, TX.

He is currently fronting the metal punk band Bonesaw Romance, has recorded an album of more acoustic, lounge-type songs under the moniker Scott Reynolds and the Steaming Beast, and is working with former All band-mate, guitarist Stephen Egerton on another project, 40Engine.

Between October 2009 and February 2010, Scott produced and sang back up vocals on the album "Second to All" for local Austin punk band The Butts. The album was mastered by former All band-mate, guitarist Stephen Egerton and was released in early 2011.

As of 2017, Reynolds regularly tours the US with his solo acoustic music and his trusty pet chihuahua JB (short for Justin Bieber).

Reunion
On January 26, 2008, Egerton, Stevenson, and Alvarez reunited with Scott Reynolds to play a set of All songs as an opening act for Drag the River at the Aggie in Fort Collins. In mid-April of that year, the band announced that they would be reuniting once again with Reynolds for Chicago, Illinois's 'Riot Fest' on October 12. They performed at the Congress Theater in Chicago, playing for over an hour before Chicago police shut down the show.

Additionally, ALL performed two warm up shows; one in Japan in July 2008 and the other at the Democratic National Convention in Denver, Colorado on August 29, 2008. The DNC show was cut short and the band completed an additional set that evening at the Three Kings Bar in downtown Denver, CO.

In an interview with RiotFest.org, Scott Reynolds does not rule out the possibility of writing new material but sets three conditions that need to be present: People want to hear new music, he feels the need to create, and the "bro" factor between the bandmates needs to be there.

Discography
 All - Allroy's Revenge - 1989
 All - She's My Ex - 1989
 All - Allroy Saves - 1990
 All - Trailblazer:Live - 1990
 TonyAll - New Girl, Old Story - 1991
 All - Dot EP - 1992
 All - Percolater - 1992
 Goodbye Harry - Food Stamp B-B-Q - 1995
 Goodbye Harry - I Can Smoke - 1996
 ALL - S/T - 1999
 The Pavers - Local 1500 - 1999
 The Pavers - Beautiful (EP) - 2002
 The Pavers - Wrecking Ball (EP) - 2002
 The Pavers - Taco or Tambourine (EP) - 2002
 The Pavers - Return to the Island of No Return - 2002 
 The Pavers - No Show, Prefab Unison (Split EP)- 2003
 Fastgato - Feral - 2003
 Bonesaw Romance - S/T - 2006
 Scott Reynolds - Adventure Boy - 2007
 Scott Reynolds and the Steaming Beast - Adventure Boy - 2008
 40 Engine - TBA 2008
 Scott Reynolds - Stupid World - 2014
 Scott Reynolds - Chihuahua in Buffalo - 2021

References

External links 
 Scott Reynolds' Official MySpace page
 RiotFest.org profile

American punk rock singers
American male singers
Living people
All (band) members
Year of birth missing (living people)